Eeva-Kaarina Volanen (January 15, 1921 Kuusankoski – January 29, 1999 Helsinki) was a Finnish actress. She worked at the Finnish National Theatre for 45 years (1945–1990). Her husband was professor Sakari Puurunen (July 25, 1921 Iisalmi – August 5, 2000 Helsinki). They had no children.

Volanen died suddenly in 1999, at age 78.

Awards
Jussi Award four times: three times as best actress, in 1948, 1949, and 1950, and in 1992 she received a Lifetime achievement Jussi Award.
Pro Finlandia medal of the Order of the Lion of Finland in 1966.
Ida Aalberg award.

Filmography
Synnin jäljet (1946)
"Minä elän" (1946)
Suopursu kukkii (1947)
Naiskohtaloita (1947)
Toukokuun taika (1948)
Ruma Elsa (1949)
Prinsessa Ruusunen (1949)
Katupeilin takana (1949)
Katarina kaunis leski (1950)
Hallin Janne (1950)
Kesäillan valssi (1951)
Kolmiapila (1953)
Onnelliset (1954)
Kun on tunteet (1954)
Musta rakkaus (1957)
Pala valkoista marmoria (1998)

References

1921 births
1999 deaths
People from Kuusankoski
20th-century Finnish actresses